Telemeter was an American subscription television service developed by the International Telemeter Corporation, that operated from 1953 to 1967. Telemeter was used on a coin-to-box machine connected to any television set. When the right amount of money was deposited into the box, a scrambled signal sent through coaxial cables was unscrambled and rendered visible.

Overview
Unlike most early pay television methods, Telemeter did not lease spectrum space. Instead, it used wires, which provided a direct link between the subscriber and the television studio. The system did not interfere with the closed-spectrum television signals, but rather used a closed circuit system working with a film chain. The service was offered in three channels available to its subscribers who could choose from one of the three using a dial located on the box. The box would be installed at the television set to receive the scrambled signals onto low-VHF channels (usually channels 5 or 6) for descrambling.

Tests began on November 27, 1953, in Palm Springs, California. The first feature film broadcast on pay television was the world premiere of Forever Female, starring Ginger Rogers and William Holden. The film was broadcast live from the Plaza Theatre. Viewers could put $1.25 into the Telemeter boxes atop their television sets. Normal community antenna television services, which gave subscribers the major Los Angeles stations, cost about $5.40 a month. But with the set top box, installed at $21.75, subscribers could get first-run films and sporting events at a price of $1.25 per program. By early 1954, the Telemeter subscription system had signed up 148 households. The film studios, however, due to pressure from theater owners and film distributors, put Telemeter under risk. Following a lawsuit from a local drive-in theater owner, the film supply all but dried up, and Paramount Pictures was unsatisfied by customers playing only Paramount films. The service ended on May 15, 1954.

In 1959, nearly five years after its original shutdown, International Telemeter Corp. (now fully owned by Paramount) began tests in Canada, under the name of Trans-Canada Telemeter Ltd., as Canada was outside of the FCC's jurisdiction and as U.S. antitrust laws which threatened Paramount did not extend to Canada. Services began in Etobicoke, Ontario on February 26, 1960, with 1,000 subscribers. Programming during the first trial years consisted essentially of first-run movies and fictional series. The overall cost of the investment was $1.5 million. In 1961, Telemeter signed deals with the Toronto Argonauts football team and the Toronto Maple Leafs to broadcast away games; wrestling was also featured. Some original programming, such as a Bob Newhart special, were also produced at Telemeter's Bloor Street studio and several Broadway shows and an opera performance were also broadcast.
 
The Canadian experiment was not a success and was not extended outside of Etobicoke and the then neighbouring communities of Long Branch, Mimico and New Toronto, and was discontinued on April 30, 1965. At its peak, 5,800 households were subscribed. By the time it shut down operations, it only had 2,500 subscribers.

Around the time of the closure of its service in Toronto, Telemeter was planning an experimental pay television service that would offer three pay channels on an 11-channel CATV system in Montreal. The service was never carried out. Throughout the mid-1960s, Telemeter executives urged the FCC to authorize pay-TV as part of CATV in the United States.

In 1966, Paramount was purchased by Gulf+Western. Telemeter eventually became a separate subsidiary of G+W, which became owner of another NHL team, the New York Rangers, in 1977. It built two CATV systems in two states and applied for franchises in more than 200 cities. Throughout the late 1960s and early 1970s, International Telemeter would continue, with little success, to develop new types of CATV and pay-TV equipment.

Despite the failure of Telemeter, it was a technological innovation, introducing pay television into CATV systems, predating later premium television services such as HBO, Showtime and Starz, which would be carried on cable and satellite.

In popular culture 
In 1991 The Simpsons episode "Like Father, Like Clown," a depressed Krusty secludes himself in a bus station and watches a coin-operated television; when the video cuts out, he inserts another quarter.

In the song “Pictures of Me” by Elliott Smith, he sings the line “Saw you and me on the coin-op TV.”

References

Further reading

Television terminology
American subscription television services
Pay-per-view television networks in Canada
Defunct television networks in the United States
Television channels and stations established in 1953
Television channels and stations disestablished in 1967